The Armenian name , transliterated Varoujan (in Western Armenian), Varujan, or Varuzhan, is both a masculine given name and a surname. It may refer to:


Varoujan
Varoujan Garabedian (born 1954), Syrian-Armenian activist
Varoujan Hakhbandian, Iranian composer and songwriter of Armenian descent
Varoujan Hergelian (born 1946), Archbishop, Catholicosal Vicar of the Armenian Prelature of Cyprus
Varoujan Koroghlian  (born 1987)
American musician from The Apocalyptic Fist Of The Black Death

Varujan
Daniel Varujan (1884–1915), (Taniel Varoujan in Western Armenian), Armenian poet
Varujan Boghosian (born 1926), American sculptor
Varujan Kojian (1935–1993), American conductor 
Varujan Vosganian (born 1958), Romanian politician, economist, essayist and poet

Varuzhan
Varuzhan Akobian (born 1983), Armenian-American chess grandmaster
Varuzhan Sukiasyan (born 1956), Armenian footballer and manager
Varuzhan Yepremyan (born 1959), Armenian painter

Armenian masculine given names
Armenian-language surnames